Lantern is an album by Clogs, released in 2006.

Track listing
"Kapsburger" – 2:05
"Canon" – 4:15
"5/4" – 2:42
"2:3:5" – 5:14
"Death and the Maiden" – 6:22
"Lantern" – 5:47
"Tides of Washington Bridge" – 4:07
"The Song of the Cricket" – 4:44
"Fiddlegree" – 3:37
"Compass" – 4:56
"Voisins" – 2:52
"Tides (Piano)" – 3:20

References

2006 albums